Weierbach may refer to:
Weierbach (Brunsbach), a river of North Rhine-Westphalia, Germany, right tributary of the Brunsbach
Weierbach, a community today part of Idar-Oberstein, Rhineland-Palatinate, Germany